Ancud is a city in southern Chile located in the northernmost part of the island and province of Chiloé, in Los Lagos Region. It is the second largest city of Chiloé Archipelago after Castro. The city was established in 1768 to function as the capital of the archipelago and held that position until 1982. Founded as bulwark against foreign powers in colonial times, the city played an important role in the Chilean colonization of Patagonia in the 19th century.

Geography
Numerous glaciations have dredged the Chacao Channel to the north, separating Chiloé Island from mainland Chile to the north, marking the border between two natural regions of Chile, Zona Sur to the north and Zona Austral to the south. The Pacific Ocean lies on the west as the Chilean Coastal Range continues as a chain of islands. To the southeast of the commune is Quemchi and Dalcahue to the south. To the west are the coastal villages of Pumillahue and Quetalmahue, among others. 25 kilometers west of Ancud lies Islotes de Puñihuil Natural Monument, a group of preserved islands that provide habitat to various penguin species.

History
Prior to its establishment as a Spanish settlement the site of Ancud was known as Puerto Inglés (lit. English port). It was on here that Hendrik Brouwer, the leader of the Dutch expedition to Valdivia died on August 7, 1643, before reaching Valdivia.

As consequence of the Seven Years' War the Spanish authorities had the coastal fortification system of Chile updated and expanded. Inspired in the recommendations of former governor Antonio Narciso de Santa María, the Spanish  founded the "city-fort" of Ancud in 1767–1768 and separated Chiloé from the Captaincy General of Chile into a direct dependency of the Viceroyalty of Peru. As with other 18th-century forts in Chile, the establishment of Ancud led through the new Ancud-Castro road to an expansion on local trade and agriculture.

Between 1839 and 1864 the Chilean Navy ran the Ancud Nautic School in the town. Among its alumni was Francisco Hudson.

Climate
Ancud has an oceanic climate (Köppen climate classification Cfb) with significant precipitation in each month. Temperatures rarely exceed .

Demographics
Of these, 27,292 (68.3%) lived in urban areas and 12,654 (31.7%) in rural areas. The population grew by 6.5% (2,430 persons) between the 1992 and 2002 censuses. The demonym of a person from Ancud is Ancuditano for a man and Ancuditana for a woman.

Administration
As a commune, Ancud is a third-level administrative division of Chile administered by a municipal council, headed by an alcalde who is directly elected every four years. The 2008-2012 alcalde is Federico Krüger Finterbüch.

Within the electoral divisions of Chile, Ancud is represented in the Chamber of Deputies by Mr. Gabriel Ascencio (PDC) and Mr. Alejandro Santana (RN) as part of the 58th electoral district, together with Castro, Quemchi, Dalcahue, Curaco de Vélez, Quinchao, Puqueldón, Chonchi, Queilén, Quellón, Chaitén, Hualaihué, Futaleufú and Palena. The commune is represented in the Senate by Camilo Escalona Medina (PS) and Carlos Kuschel Silva (RN) as part of the 17th senatorial constituency (Los Lagos Region).

Education
Previously the area had a German school, Deutsche Schule Ancud-Chiloe.

Landmarks

Cathedral

Colonial fort system

The fort system of Ancud together with nearby the forts of Agüi one of the four fort systems that existed in colonial Chiloé. The fort system of Ancud is made up of two forts and four batteries. Fuerte Real de San Carlos was built as late as 1824 by orders of Antonio de Quintanilla, the last Spanish governor of Chiloé. The arsenal (polvorín) of this can still be seen at the centre of a small plaza. The battery of San Antonio is the best preserved part of the fort system.

Gallery

See also 
Ancud Volcanic Complex
Churches of Chiloé
Islotes de Puñihuil Natural Monument
Mahlon Williamson (barque)

References

External links 

 
  Municipality of Ancud
 Satellite view of the Chiloé archipielago (Google maps)
 Satellite view of Ancud (Google maps)

 
Communes of Chile
Port cities in Chile
Populated places established in 1768
Populated places in Chiloé Province
1768 establishments in the Spanish Empire
Populated coastal places in Chile